VCN may refer to:

The ventral cochlear nucleus
Acrylonitrile, also called vinyl cyanide
Vancouver Community Network
Video Core Next – brand for some ASIC related to video compression and decompression by AMD
Virtual Card Number - see Controlled Payment Number